Norwegian of the Century was a poll carried out by the Norwegian Broadcasting Corporation in 2005, the 100-year anniversary of Norwegian independence. The poll was SMS-based and over 400,000 Norwegians voted over the course of the year. To qualify as "Norwegian of the Century", the nominee must have lived between 1905 and 2005. All Norwegians were eligible for nomination, and there were initially 600 people on the list. A "Great Norwegian Committee" (Store Norske komiteen) consisting of Nils Arne Eggen, Astrid Nøklebye Heiberg, Guri Hjeltnes, Harald Norvik, Erling Sandmo and Cathrine Sandnes narrowed the list down to 50. Another poll was conducted, again SMS-based, with the results presented live on NRK1 on 17 December 2005. The winner, with 41% of the vote, was King Olav V. Former Prime Minister Einar Gerhardsen was second with 24%, followed by Erik Bye with 15%. The results for the top 50 spots were as follows:

 
 
 
 
Olav V (1903–1991) - King of Norway (21 September 1957 – 17 January 1991)
Einar Gerhardsen (1897–1987) - politician and Prime Minister of Norway (1945–1951, 1955–1963, 1963–1965)
Erik Bye (1926–2004) - journalist, artist, author, film actor, folk singer and radio and television personality
Kim Friele (1935–2021) - gay rights and human rights activist 
Thor Heyerdahl (1914–2002) - ethnographer, led Kon-Tiki expedition
Mari Boine (1956–) - Norwegian Sami musician
Gro Harlem Brundtland (1939–) - politician and 22nd Prime Minister of Norway (1981, 1986–1989, 1990–1996)
Haakon VII (1872–1957) - King of Norway (18 November 1905 – 21 September 1957)
Christian Michelsen (1857–1925) - shipping magnate, statesman, and 1st Prime Minister of Norway (1905–1907)
Fridtjof Nansen (1861–1930) - explorer, diplomat, and Nobel Peace Prize laureate
Ivar Asbjørn Følling (1888–1973) - physicist and biochemist known for describing the disease commonly known as Følling's disease or phenylketonuria
Grete Waitz (1953–2011) - marathon runner, first woman to run a marathon in under two and a half hours
Alf Prøysen (1914–1970) - author, poet, playwright and musician
Helge Ingstad (1899–2001) and Anne Stine Ingstad (1918–1997) - archaeologists and explorers of a Norse settlement at L'Anse aux Meadows in 1960
Anne-Cath. Vestly (1920–2008) - author of children's literature 
Gunnar Sønsteby (1918–2012) - member of the Norwegian resistance movement during the German occupation of Norway in World War II.
Knut Hamsun (1859–1952) - writer, Nobel laureate in Literature
Kjell Aukrust (1920–2002) - author and poet
Eivind Berggrav (1884–1959) - Lutheran bishop, figure in resistance against German occupation of Norway
Kirsten Flagstad (1859–1962) - opera singer and dramatic soprano
Ole Gunnar Solskjær (1973–) - football player and manager
Hjalmar Andersen (1923–2013) - speed skater, won three gold medals at the 1952 Winter Olympic Games held in Oslo, Norway
Edvard Munch (1863–1944) - painter and print-maker, best known for painting The Scream
Bjørn Dæhlie (1967–) - cross–country skier, won a total of 29 medals in the Olympics and World Championships from 1991 and 1999
Carl Joachim Hambro (1885–1964) - journalist, author and politician
Katti Anker Møller (1868–1945) - feminist, children's rights advocate, reproductive rights activist
Kristian Ottosen (1921–2006) - non–fiction writer and public servant
Rosemarie Köhn (1939–) - bishop in the Diocese of Hamar of the Church of Norway
Bjørn Wirkola (1943–) - ski jumper
Sam Eyde (1866–1940) - engineer and industrialist
Olav Selvaag (1912–2002) - residential contractor, responsible for innovative design for building affordable housing in Post–World War II economic expansion
Arne Arnardo (1912–1995) - circus performer, generally known as the "circus king" of Norway
Karl Evang (1902–1981) - physician and civil servant
Thorbjørn Egner (1912–1990) - playwright and songwriter for children
Halldis Moren Vesaas (1907–1995) - poet for children
Jan Garbarek (1947–) - jazz saxophonist
Finn Lied (1916–2014) - military researcher and politician
Sigrid Undset (1882–1949) - novelist, Nobel laureate in Literature
Wenche Foss (1917–2011) - actress of stage, screen, and television
Erling Stordahl (1923–1994) - farmer and singer
Oscar Mathisen (1888–1954) - speed skater
Sonja Henie (1912–1969) - figure skater and film star
Arne Nordheim (1931–2010) - composer
Trygve Lie (1896–1968) - politician, Minister of Foreign Affairs (1940–1946) and 1st Secretary-General of the United Nations (1946–1952)
Inger Hagerup (1905–1985)  - poet
Johs Andenæs (1912–2003) - jurist
Liv Ullmann (1938–) - actress and film director
Ragnar Frisch (1895–1973) - economist, being one of the founders of the discipline of econometrics, and for coining the widely used term pair macroeconomics/microeconomics in 1933; awarded Nobel Memorial Prize in Economic Sciences in 1968
Gustav Vigeland (1869–1943) - sculptor
Francis Bull (1887–1974) - literary historian

References

Greatest Nationals
Lists of Norwegian people
2005 Norwegian television series debuts
2005 Norwegian television series endings
Norwegian television series based on British television series